The Sea View Farm FC is an Antigua and Barbuda Football Association team playing in the local second level – the First Division.

Motto
"One Strength"

External links

Football clubs in Antigua and Barbuda
Association football clubs established in 1965
1965 establishments in Antigua and Barbuda